Billy "Crash" Craddock is a country album by Billy "Crash" Craddock. It was released on the Capitol label in 1978.

The only hit song in the United States was "I Cheated On A Good Woman's Love" which reached #4 on the country charts.

Track listing

References

External reference
[ Billy "Crash" Craddock] at Allmusic

Billy "Crash" Craddock albums
1978 albums